is a Japanese fantasy adventure manga series written and illustrated by Shinobu Ohtaka. It was serialized in Shogakukan's shōnen manga magazine Weekly Shōnen Sunday from June 2009 to October 2017, with its chapters collected and published into 37 tankōbon volumes. The manga is licensed for English release in North America by Viz Media.

An anime television adaptation by A-1 Pictures was broadcast in Japan from October 2012 to March 2013, followed by a second season, titled Magi: The Kingdom of Magic, broadcast from October 2013 to March 2014. The anime series is licensed in North America by Aniplex of America. It was also licensed by Kazé in United Kingdom and by Madman Entertainment in Australia.

A spin-off series, titled Magi: Adventure of Sinbad, written by Ohtaka and illustrated by Yoshifumi Ohtera, was serialized in Weekly Shōnen Sunday from May to June 2013, and later on Shogakukan's website Ura Sunday from September 2013 to April 2018.

In 2014, Magi: The Labyrinth of Magic received the 59th Shogakukan Manga Award for the shōnen category. As of April 2018, the manga had over 25 million copies in circulation.

Synopsis

Setting
The series is largely based on numerous stories from One Thousand and One Nights (Arabian Nights), most notably the tales of Aladdin, Ali Baba, and Sinbad the Sailor. The story is set in an alternate recreation of the ancient Old World with several regions and nations having some resemblances with real-life counterparts from that time.

This energy must be used with care, as despite the fact that an individual's magoi can be restored with feeding and rest, once fully exhausted it causes their death. A Magi usually chooses Dungeon Capturers to offer guidance and protection making them into their . There are several nations in history that were founded or improved by the rule of such individuals.

Plot

Fourteen years ago, a structure appeared from the sea, turning into a gigantic tower. Thousands of people entered, and did not come out. Until one day, it gets conquered by two special people, a Magi and a King.

Magi centers around Alibaba Saluja (a young man aiming to capture the nearby dungeon, Amon) and Aladdin (a traveler with a Djinn named Ugo in his flute). Witnessing the power of Aladdin's Djinn, Alibaba finds an opportunity to go dungeon diving with him. Aladdin and Alibaba eventually become friends, and conquer Amon together, despite facing Jamil and his slaves, Morgiana and Goltas. After a desperate fight, Aladdin and Alibaba assist Morgiana in breaking the mental chains that bind her to Jamil. Alibaba claims the dungeon while the Djinn Amon appears to briefly explain that Aladdin is a Magi and Alibaba is his king's candidate. However, they are interrupted by an outside force trying to close the dungeon off. Alibaba, Aladdin, and Morgiana escape the dungeon while Goltas resolves to die to atone for his sins along with Jamil, but not before cutting Morgiana's shackles. Aladdin ends up sent to a distant land, far from the others, where he learns he is a Magi. Having no news of his friend, Alibaba uses the treasure he obtained in Amon to free all slaves in the city, including Morgiana and returns to Balbadd, his homeland.

Aladdin and Morgiana encounter Sinbad, the first Dungeon Capturer and the king of Sindria. They eventually reunite with Alibaba in Balbadd, where they learn that he has joined the Fog Troupe, a cadre of thieves opposing the tyrannical rule of Abhmad, Alibaba's half-brother. Alibaba makes the monarchy a republic nation in Balbadd, however, Balbadd ends up annexed to the Kou Empire, a powerful Eastern nation that plans to conquer the entire world with the pretense of ending all conflict.

Aladdin, Alibaba, and Morgiana are brought to Sindria. They train under the members of Sinbad's household to get stronger and help stop the mysterious organization, Al-Thamen, that works secretly to spread chaos throughout the world as part of an unknown agenda. The trio befriends Hakuryuu Ren, a prince of the Kou Empire visiting Sindria, whom they help to conquer the dungeon of Zagan; where after confronting members of Al-Thamen there, the group separate upon return. Aladdin studies at Magnostadt Academy to study magic and investigate the country's ties to Al-Thamen. Alibaba goes to train with the Yambala Gladiators in the Reim Empire to fix his magoi, so he can achieve his complete Djinn Equip. Hakuryuu returns to the Kou Empire, and Morgiana departs to the Dark Continent.

A year later, Aladdin and Alibaba are reunited during Reim's and Kou's campaign to conquer Magnostadt. As a last resort, Matal Mogamett summons an army of Dark Djinns with a huge mass of Black Rukh stored in its deepest level to defeat the invaders for good, but Aladdin reveals that by doing this, Mogamett unwillingly helped Al-Thamen to get closer to their main objective; to summon Ill Ilah, whose advent will cause the world's destruction. The medium appears, and Alibaba and his friends join forces with the Kou Empire, Reim, and the Alliance of Seven Seas to stop it.

A few months later after Alibaba revisits Balbadd, representatives from Kou, Reim and Sindria gather for a summit organized by Sinbad. At the summit, Aladdin reveals that mankind was originally several distinct species transformed by magic into humans from the world of Alma-Torran, located in another dimension. Ill Ilah, had its magoi stolen by Aladdin's father, King Solomon, in order to create a destiny favorable to the people of Alma-Torran. Resisting this change, the members of Al-Thamen summoned Ill llah to the world sapping its magoi by destruction.  Solomon is forced to give his life to seal away Ill Ilah and Al-Thamen. Solomon gave his magoi to Ugo, and Ugo used it to create the current world and transport everyone from Alma-Torran to this world.

Suddenly, Hakuryuu Ren and Judar start a civil war in the Kou Empire. Alibaba and Aladdin rush to the Kou Empire to talk sense into Hakuryuu, however, they realize that he has fallen into depravity. The two duos fight and Alibaba and Judar end up as casualties. After the war ends, Sinbad starts his plan of bringing a new era of peace to the world, while Aladdin, Morgiana and Hakuryuu take separate ways. Alibaba meets the people of Alma Torran who proceed to help him get revived. Later, Judar and Alibaba meet on the other side of the Dark Continent, where they encounter the Mother Dragon who decides to assist them in traveling back to the mainland, however this would be a long journey. While traveling back, Mother Dragon reveals that Ill Ilah's persona has been corrupt by David, the father of King Solomon. He is also revealed to be connected to Sinbad and wants to become God of all.

Three years later, Alibaba reappears and solves the Kou Empire's economic problems. He reunites with his friends after they defeat Arba, apparently destroying Al-Thamen for good, but Arba's spirit turns to Sinbad, and together, they reach the Sacred Palace and Sinbad defeats Ugo taking over the palace. Sinbad rewrites the Rukh system; the only way for happiness is by turning into Rukh, or death. Alibaba and Aladdin joins forces with Judar and Hakuryuu to confront Sinbad, but just after they reach a compromise, David appears and takes control of the Sacred Palace; returning all souls to the Rukh was his original plan. David enters world and starts causing chaos and destroying everything to turn it back into Rukh. Alibaba struggles to defend the world; he faces more trouble when the entire world is working for David because are brainwashed due to the Rukh change, and are fighting Alibaba. Yunan and Aladdin confront the real David, in the form of a child. The spell of rewriting the Rukh gets stopped. Alibaba's allies who were fighting him have now teamed up with him. Sinbad helps kill David by sacrificing all his power into killing him; it is unknown whether Sinbad is dead or alive. The Magi system, dungeons, metal vessel, sacred palace, and the continental chasm, disappear, leading the nations unify their efforts to create a better future. After Alibaba visits Cassim's grave, he marries Morgiana.

Media

Manga

Magi: The Labyrinth of Magic, written and illustrated by Shinobu Ohtaka, was serialized by Shogakukan in the shōnen manga magazine Weekly Shōnen Sunday from June 3, 2009, to October 11, 2017. Shogakukan collected its 369 individual chapters in thirty-seven tankōbon volumes, released from December 18, 2009, to November 17, 2017.

In North America, Viz Media announced in February 2013 they licensed the manga for an English release. The thirty-seven tankōbon volumes of the series were published from August 13, 2013, to August 13, 2019.

A spin-off series, titled Magi: Adventure of Sinbad, written by Ohtaka and illustrated by Yoshifumi Ohtera, was released as an additional material with the first volume of the anime series. It was later expanded into a regular series, which was serialized in Weekly Shōnen Sunday from May 18 to June 26, 2013. It was then transferred over to Shogakukan's webcomic site Ura Sunday (also available later on the MangaONE app), being published from September 18, 2013, to April 25, 2018.

Anime

During the Shogakukan's Jisedai World Hobby Fair '12 Summer event, an anime television adaptation was announced on the event's official website. The anime series, produced by A-1 Pictures, aired on MBS/TBS's 5:00 p.m timeslot from October 7, 2012, to March 31, 2013. For the first 12 episodes, the opening theme song is "V.I.P." by SID and the ending theme song is "Yubi Bōenkyō" by Nogizaka46. From episode 13 onwards, the opening song is "Matataku Hoshi no Shita de" by Porno Graffitti and the ending is "The Bravery" by Supercell.

Just after the end of the anime series, a second season titled Magi: The Kingdom of Magic was announced. The series aired, at the same timeslot of the first season, from October 6, 2013, to March 30, 2014. For the first 13 episodes, the opening theme song is "Anniversary" by SID and the ending theme song is "Eden" by Aqua Timez, while from episode 14 onwards, the opening theme song is "Hikari" by ViViD and the ending theme song is "With You/With Me" by 9nine.

The series debuted in North America on October 10, 2012, on Crunchyroll and Hulu. Aniplex of America licensed the series and its English dub was streamed on Viz Media's Neon Alley service starting on October 18, 2013. In December 2019, Funimation added the series to its streaming service. It has also been licensed by Viz Media Europe in Europe, Kazé in the UK (distributed by Manga Entertainment), and by Madman Entertainment in Australia.

Video games
 was released for the Nintendo 3DS. The game was produced by Bandai Namco Games and was released in Japan on February 21, 2013. The game got an update with more playable characters, a new dungeon and more story.

 is the sequel to The Labyrinth of Beginnings. It was released for the 3DS, and was announced in September 2013. The game was released on February 13, 2014.

A Mobage social card battle game, was developed by Nexon for feature phones and smartphones and available from November 21, 2012, to January 30, 2015.

A RPG mobile game, Magi: Dungeons & Magic, was distributed by Nexon for smartphones and available from February 20, 2014, to September 17, 2015.

Stage play
In March 2022, it was announced that the series would receive a stage musical adaptation, titled , which ran at the Tennozu Galaxy Theater in Tokyo on June 3–12, 2022, and at the Morinomiya Piloti Hall in Osaka on June 18–19 of the same year. The cast included Yugo Miyajima as Aladdin, Hiroki Ino as Alibaba, Nana Okada as Morgiana, Mitshuhiro Nagatomo as Budel, Miho Sugimoto as Baba, Shо̄go Onozuka as Goltas, Shina Tanaka as Ren Hakuei, Akito Teshima as Judar, Daisuke Hirose as Kassim, Takuji Kawakubo as Jamil, and Toshiyuki Morikawa (voice appearance) as Ugo. Kо̄tarо̄ Yoshitani directed the musical, with screenplay by Sayaka Asai, music composed by Shuhei Kamimura and choreography handled by Mamoru. A second stage play was announced in March 2023, featuring the same cast and staff from the first one, and will run at Shinagawa Prince Hotel Stellar Ball in Tokyo on June 9–18, 2023, and Morinomiya Piloti Hall in Osaka on June 24–25 of the same year.

Reception
Four months after the series' anime adaptation announcement in June 2012, the print circulation of the manga went from 3 million copies of the first 12 volumes to over 6.5 million copies of the first 14 volumes in October of the same year. As of October 2013, the manga had over 13 million copies in circulation. The numbers increased to over 18 million copies in circulation as of May 2015, and over 23 million copies in circulation as of April 2016. As of April 2018, the manga had over 25 million copies in circulation. In Japan, Magi: The Labyrinth of Magic was the 9th top selling manga series in 2012; 4th in 2013; 8th in 2014; 20th in 2015 and 2016; and 10th in 2017, its final serialization year.

The series ranked #16 on Takarajimasha's Kono Manga ga Sugoi! list of best manga of 2013 for male readers. The series won the 59th Shogakukan Manga Award in the shōnen category in 2014. On TV Asahi's Manga Sōsenkyo 2021 poll, in which 150.000 people voted for their top 100 manga series, Magi: The Labyrinth of Magic ranked #75.

In his review of the first volume of the manga, L.B Bryant noted "not only is it a shonen title but it's a GOOD shonen title" and recommended it be picked up. Rebecca Silverman of Anime News Network ranked the first volume as a B. Silverman criticized how the fanservice was handled and pointed out that the story felt more like a role-playing game than a manga, and that it seemed as if Ohtaka was not sure about the story's direction. She compared Aladdin to One Pieces protagonist Monkey D. Luffy and commented that Ohtaka's art improved since her last series Sumomomo, Momomo. Silverman concluded, "overall those looking for a good old shounen adventure story about a couple of plucky kids (with bonus burly djinn!) pursuing their dreams should give this a shot. It isn't perfect, but it is a good time". Leroy Douresseaux of Comic Book Bin also ranked the first volume as a B, and compared Ohtaka's art style to Yuuki Iinuma's Itsuwaribito. She described Magi as a "straight-forward, fun to read adventure, part Prince of Persia and part Raiders of the Lost Ark". Kelly Quinn of The B&N Sci-Fi and Fantasy Blog included the series on her list of "7 Butt-Kicking Shonen Manga by Women Writers".

IGN listed Magi: The Labyrinth of Magic among the best anime series of the 2010s, and wrote that it is "a fun watch and has a surprising amount of action for those that are fans of shonen".

Notes

References

External links
 
 
 

2009 manga
2012 anime television series debuts
2013 anime television series debuts
A-1 Pictures
Adventure anime and manga
Anime composed by Shirō Sagisu
Anime series based on manga
Aniplex franchises
Coming-of-age anime and manga
Fantasy anime and manga
Genies in anime and manga
Mainichi Broadcasting System original programming
Sharp Point Press titles
Shogakukan franchises
Shogakukan manga
Shōnen manga
Viz Media manga
Winners of the Shogakukan Manga Award for shōnen manga
Works based on One Thousand and One Nights